Thania Peterson is a multi-disciplinary artist. Her work is in the collections of notable museums and galleries including the Smithsonian's National Museum of African Art and the Zeitz Museum of Contemporary Art Africa.

Biography 
In her art, she uses photography, performance and installation to address themes of Islamophobia, imperialism and colonialism.

Peterson lives and works in Cape Town, South Africa.

Public Collections 

 Pérez Art Museum Miami
 Nationaal Museum van Wereldculturen, Rotterdam
 National Museum of African Art, Smithsonian Institution, Washington D.C.
 Oscar Niemeyer Museum, Curitiba
 Durban Art Gallery
 Iziko South African National Gallery
 Zeitz Museum of Contemporary Art Africa

References 

People from Cape Town
Artists from Cape Town
Year of birth missing (living people)
Living people